This is a list of public art in Muncie, Indiana.

This list applies only to works of public art accessible in an outdoor public space. For example, this does not include artwork visible inside a museum.  

Most of the works mentioned are sculptures. When this is not the case (e.g., sound installation,) it is stated next to the title.

References

Muncie, Indiana
Tourist attractions in Muncie, Indiana
Muncie, Indiana